This is the discography of American hip hop recording artist George Watsky.

Albums

Studio albums

Mixtapes

Invisible Inc.

Remix projects

Extended plays

Live releases

Singles

Guest appearances

Notes

References

Hip hop discographies